KOMS (107.3 FM) is a radio station broadcasting a classic country format. It licensed to Poteau, Oklahoma, United States, and serves the Fort Smith area. The station is owned by Cumulus Media.

External links
BigCountry1073.com

Country radio stations in the United States
OMS
Cumulus Media radio stations